Aloe sinkatana is a small, stemless Aloe native to Sudan.

See also
Succulent plant

References

sinkatana
Flora of Sudan
Endemic flora of Sudan
Plants described in 1957